Wrath of Love is a 1917 American silent drama film directed by James Vincent and starring Virginia Pearson, Louise Bates and Irving Cummings.

Cast
 Virginia Pearson as Roma Winnet 
 Louise Bates as Ethel Clarke 
 Irving Cummings as Bob Lawson 
 Nellie Slattery as Mrs. Lawson 
 J. Frank Glendon as Dave Blake 
 John McCann as Caddy

References

Bibliography
 Solomon, Aubrey. The Fox Film Corporation, 1915-1935: A History and Filmography. McFarland, 2011.

External links
 

1917 films
1917 drama films
1910s English-language films
American silent feature films
Silent American drama films
American black-and-white films
Films directed by James Vincent
Fox Film films
1910s American films